Leopoldinia piassaba, the Para piassava, piassava fiber palm or piassava palm, is a palm native to black water rivers in Amazonian Brazil and Venezuela, from which is extracted piassava, a high caliber and water resistant fiber. Piassaba fiber is made into brooms, baskets and other products. This plant is also a natural habitat of the Rhodnius brethesi which is a potential vector of Chagas disease and it is cited in Flora Brasiliensis by Carl Friedrich Philipp von Martius.

References 

 Schultes, Richard E. (1974). Palms and religion in the northwest Amazon. Principes 18 (1): 3-21. Astrocaryum vulgare, Bactris gasipaes, Euterpe oleracea, E. precatoria, Leopoldinia piassaba, Maximiliana martiana, Oenocarpus bacaba, Socratea exorrhiza
 Rocha, Dayse da Silva; Santos, Carolina Magalhães dos; Cunha, Vanda; Jurberg, José; Galvão, Cleber.  Life cycle of Rhodnius brethesi Matta, 1919 (Hemiptera, Reduviidae, Triatominae), a potential vector of Chagas disease in the Amazon region. (Abstract in English) 2004 October;  99 (6): 591–595.

External links 
 
 USDA Plants Profile: Leopoldinia piassaba 
  Flora Brasiliensis:   Leopoldinia piassaba

Arecoideae
Trees of the Amazon
Trees of Brazil
Trees of Venezuela